Cerro Doña Juana is the highest peak in the municipality of Orocovis, Puerto Rico, rising to  above sea level. It is part of the Toro Negro State Forest, and is the 12th tallest mountain in Puerto Rico.

Hiking and access trail
Trail number 3, known as "Camino Torre Observacion", makes its way up to Cerro Doña Juana from Trail #1 (Camino El Bolo) which can be started at the Toro Negro State Forest visitors area. The visitors parking area is located on PR-143, km 34.4.  PR-143 is a winding two-lane mountain road that must be travelled very slowly as it is not possible to see traffic coming the opposite direction for any significant length. Route 143 can be accessed via the better-traveled Route 10. Route 143 is part of the Ruta Panorámica. There is an observation tower atop Cerro Doña Juana.

References

External links
 Las cumbres más altas de Puerto Rico. Universidad Interamericana de Puerto Rico en Bayamon. Departamento de Ciencias Naturales y Matematicas. Retrieved 22 August 2013.)

Dona Juana
Mountains of the Caribbean
Geography of Puerto Rico
Orocovis, Puerto Rico